Julyano Pratama Nono (born 10 July 2000) is an Indonesian professional footballer who plays as a centre back for Liga 1 club Persikabo 1973.

Club career

Persikabo 1973
He was signed for Persikabo 1973 to play in Liga 1 in the 2021 season. Julyano made his first-team debut on 2 October 2021 as a substitute in a match against Bali United at the Gelora Bung Karno Madya Stadium, Jakarta.

Career statistics

Club

Notes

Honours

International 
Indonesia U-19
 AFF U-19 Youth Championship third place: 2017, 2018

References

External links
 Julyano Pratama at Soccerway
 Julyano Pratama at Liga Indonesia

2000 births
Living people
Indonesian footballers
Persikabo 1973 players
Association football defenders
Sportspeople from Makassar
21st-century Indonesian people